Filfil is a town in Eritrea, lying north of Asmara.  Based on plantations, it is known for its surrounding rainforest and its animals. It is also within one of Eritrea's protected national forests. There is a highway built exclusively for non-commercial traffic through this town connecting the cities of Asmara and Massawa through Ghatelai.

Populated places in Eritrea